Babirye is a surname. Notable people with the surname include:
Breeze Sarah Babirye Kityo (born 1986), Ugandan politician
Judith Babirye (born 1977), Ugandan singer and politician
Leilah Babirye (born 1985), Ugandan artist and activist
Mary Babirye Kabanda (born 1971), Ugandan politician
Milly Babirye Babalanda (born 1970), Ugandan politician
Veronica Babirye Kadogo (born 1977), Ugandan politician